Zawady is a district (osiedle) of Białystok, Poland.

External links 

Districts of Białystok